The Anineș is a right tributary of the river Orăștie in Transylvania, Romania. It discharges into the Orăștie near Grădiștea de Munte.

References

Rivers of Romania
Rivers of Hunedoara County